Elsa Firouz Azar (born 16 September 1983) is an Iranian actress, assistant director, scene clerk, theatre director and writer.

Education
She holds her bachelor's degree in architecture from Royan Noor University and her master's degree in drama literature from Sura University.

Career
She began acting in cinema at the age of five, and at the age of eight she played her first major role in Kakadu. At age 18, she continued her career in acting more seriously. Then in the cinema and behind the scene, experienced being the scene supervisor and assistant director in several films.
She began teaching at the age of twenty-three in the field of arts and art schools, and after completing her master's degree in drama literature, screenwriting and acting workshops were also added to her teaching disciplines.
After making some short experimental films, Firouz A'zar made the short film "Too loud a silence" for the first time at age 35 in 2018. Also in the same year, she directed a psychological-philosophical theater with 30 actors "Labyrinth and more". After writing several screenplays, for the first time, her screenplay "I hate Tehran" is being directed by Yasaman Nosrati.

Filmography

Film

Home series

Short Film

Theatre

Awards 

 In 2019, she won the award for Best Actor for Film Change Time of Direction by Maryam Rahimi of the Italian Aprilia Film Festival
 2021 winner of the award for the best artistic director of the Teletheater Hezar-o-Yek too from the  Fajr International Therater Festival
 2021 winner of the award for the best Film editing of the Teletheater Hezar-o-Yek too from the  Fajr International Therater Festival

References

External links 

Elsa Firouz Azar at the Iranian Movie Database

1983 births
Living people
People from Tehran
Iranian film actresses
Soore University alumni
Iranian stage actresses
Iranian child actresses
Iranian theatre directors
Iranian television actresses
Iranian dramatists and playwrights